Armand-Jean de Vignerot Du Plessis, duc de Richelieu (Le Havre, 3 October 1629 – Paris, 20 May 1715), was a French naval officer and nobleman. His surname has also been spelled Vignerod Duplessis.

Life and career
His father was François de Vignerot (died 26 January 1646 in Paris), who was the son of René de Vignerot and Françoise du Plessis de Richelieu (died 1615), one of the sisters of Cardinal Richelieu. He was carefully raised with his two brothers under the direction of his father's sister, the Duchess of Aiguillon, who had a marked preference for him. He became Duke of Richelieu by substitution and invested with the dignity of peer of France by the will of his great-uncle, Cardinal Richelieu, when barely thirteen years old at the latter's death in December 1642. He adopted the cardinal's surname of Du Plessis and also inherited part of the cardinal's art collection and library and his Hôtel de Richelieu (later known at the Palais Brion, just west of the Palais-Cardinal). Construction had begun in 1642 to house the cardinal's library but was unfinished at the time of the cardinal's death, when further construction halted.

Vignerot Du Plessis also became . He was sent to Naples, which had risen up against the Spanish and proclaimed the Neapolitan Republic. He joined up with Don John of Austria's fleet off Capri but was unable to land the troops he was transporting.

Art collection
The art works the duke inherited from Cardinal Richelieu were the beginning of a collection that was admired for its quality by Gian Lorenzo Bernini when he visited Paris in 1665. Paul Fréart de Chantelou, Bernini's guide and the chronicler of his visit, mentions Nicolas Poussin's the Plague at Ashdod (1630–1631, Louvre), one of fifteen paintings by Poussin owned by the duke, among which were the Saint James the Great's Vision of the Virgin Mary (1629-1630, Louvre), Triumph of Pan (1636, private collection), the Apotheosis of Saint Paul (1649–1650, Louvre), and the Four Seasons (commissioned by the duke in 1660; Louvre). The duke also owned Titian's Virgin with a Rabbit (16th century, Louvre), Annibale Caracci's The Stoning of Saint Stephen (c. 1603, Louvre), and Parmigianino's Portrait of a Young Man (1584, Louvre).

The duke commissioned Pierre Dulin to paint pendants to three paintings of pagan festivals by Poussin, including one to the Triumph of Pan. Dulin also made two large portraits of the Duke, one dressed as a Roman on horseback, the other of him in armor.

Notes

Bibliography
Aubert de La Chesnaye-Desbois, François-Alexandre; Badier (1863-1877). Dictionnaire de la noblesse, third edition. Paris: Schlesinger. Catalog record at HathiTrust.
 Bonnaffé, Edmond (1884). Dictionnaire des amateurs français au VIIe siècle. Paris: A. Quantin. Copy at Gallica.
 Champier, Victor (1900). Le Palais-Royal d'après des documents inédits (1629–1900). Tome premier: Du cardinal de Richelieu à la Révolution. Paris: Société de Propagation des Livres d'Art. Copy at HathiTrust.
 Thackray, Anne (1996). "Richelieu family(ii). (2) Duc de Richelieu [Vignerod Du Plessis, Louis-François Armand de"], vol. 26, p. 349, in The Dictionary of Art, 34 volumes, edited by Jane Turner. New York: Grove. .

1629 births
1715 deaths
Armand
French Navy admirals
17th-century peers of France
18th-century peers of France